United Kingdom v Norway [1951] ICJ 3, also known as the Fisheries Case, was the culmination of a dispute, originating in 1933, over how large an area of water surrounding Norway was Norwegian waters (that Norway thus had exclusive fishing rights to) and how much was 'high seas' (that the UK could thus fish).

History
The situation which gave rise to the dispute and the facts which preceded the filing of the British Application are recalled in the Judgment. The coastal zone concerned in the dispute is of a distinctive configuration. Its length as the crow flies exceeds 1,500 kilometers. Mountainous along its whole length, very broken by fjords and bays, dotted with countless islands, islets and reefs (certain of which form a continuous archipelago known as the skjærgård, "rock rampart"), the coast does not constitute, (as it does in practically all other countries in the world) a clear dividing line between land and sea. The land configuration stretches out into the sea and what really constitutes the Norwegian coastline is the outer line of the land formations viewed as a whole. Along the coastal zone are situated shallow banks which are very rich in fish. These have been exploited from time immemorial by the inhabitants of the mainland and of the islands: they derive their livelihood essentially from such fishing. In past centuries British fishermen had made incursions in the waters near the Norwegian coast. As a result of complaints from the King of Norway, they abstained from doing so at the beginning of the 17th century and for 300 years. But in 1906 British vessels appeared again. These were trawlers equipped with improved and powerful gear. The local population became perturbed, and measures were taken by Norway with a view to specifying the limits within which fishing was prohibited to foreigners. Incidents occurred, became more and more frequent, and on July 12, 1935 the Norwegian Government delimited the Norwegian fisheries zone by Decree. Negotiations had been entered into by the two Governments; they were pursued after the Decree was enacted, but without success. A considerable number of British trawlers were arrested and condemned in 1948 and 1949. It was then that the United Kingdom Government instituted proceedings before the Court.

Facts
On 28 September 1949, the UK requested that the International Court of Justice determine how far Norway's territorial claim extended to sea, and to award the UK damages in compensation for Norwegian interference with UK fishing vessels in the disputed waters, claiming that Norway's claim to such an extent of waters was against international law.

Judgment
On 18 December 1951, the ICJ decided that Norway's claims to the waters were consistent with international laws concerning the ownership of local sea-space.

The Court found that neither the method employed for the delimitation by the Decree, nor the lines themselves fixed by the said Decree, are contrary to international law; the first finding being adopted by ten votes to two, and the second by eight votes to four. Three Judges — MM. Alvarez, Hackworth and Hsu Mo appended to the Judgment a declaration or an individual opinion stating the particular reasons for which they reached their conclusions; two other Judges—Sir Arnold McNair and Mr. J. E. Read—appended to the Judgment statements of their dissenting Opinions.

See also
 List of International Court of Justice cases

References

Further reading

External links
International Court of Justice records of this case

International Court of Justice cases
Territorial disputes of Norway
1951 in case law
1951 in Norway
1951 in the United Kingdom
Norway–United Kingdom relations
Fishing in Norway
Fishing in the United Kingdom
Fishing conflicts
1951 in international relations